Gerald Anthony Neal (born September 22, 1945) is an American politician and attorney. He is a Democratic Party member of the Kentucky Senate, representing District 33 since January 1989.

Life and career
Born September 22, 1945, Gerald Anthony Neal is a Kentucky State Senator and attorney-at-law. He graduated from Shawnee High School (Kentucky) in 1963 and Kentucky State University in 1967 with a B.A. in History and Political Science, and was later bestowed an Honorary Doctorate in Humane Letters.

Neal received a J.D. in 1972 from the Brandeis School of Law, University of Louisville, and was later named the 2006 Distinguished Alumni Law Fellow. Neal pursued graduate studies in Political Science at the University of Michigan, and later returned to Kentucky to begin his legal career.

Neal and his wife Kathy have two children Brandon and Kristin.

Career
Neal was appointed Senior Fellow of Public Policy and Adjunct Professor in the College of Arts & Sciences, at the University of Louisville, where he taught/teaches courses in History, State and Local Government, Health and Welfare Policy, Civil Rights & the Law(including voter, housing, employment, education, and criminal justice). Neal is a practicing attorney with the law firm, Gerald A. Neal & Associates, LLC., in Louisville (KY).

Neal is the founder of the Kentucky African American All Children's Caucus which was dedicated to addressing issues of educational diversity, and the promotion of high educational standards facilitated by appropriate methodologies. He also is the founder of The African American Community Agenda Initiative (AAI) which focus on policy research, development, and community education. AAI brings together top policy makers and implementers for the purpose of engagement, analysis, and policy scrutiny leading to change.

Neal was elected to represent District 33 (in Jefferson County), being the second African American to serve, and first African American man elected to the Kentucky State Senate. Senator Neal was first elected in 1989 and has since been re-elected consecutively over the years. This represents the longest service of any African American member of the Kentucky General Assembly. He was elected Senate Democratic Caucus Chairman (2014), becoming the first African American elected to a leadership position in the history of  Kentucky.

Neal was inducted into the Kentucky Civil Rights Hall of Fame (2001), and the Gallery of Great Black Kentuckians (2012). He has served as vice president, regional director and parliamentarian of the National Bar Association, and as president of the Kentucky Chapter of the National Bar Association. He is a member of the Kentucky Bar Association and is a Louisville and Kentucky Bar Association Fellow.

Neal has served as assistant director of Public Health and Safety for the City of Louisville, was a hearing officer for the State Workers' Compensation Board and worked as a juvenile probation officer. He served five terms as chair of the Louisville-Jefferson County Metropolitan Sewer District, where he increased the transparency of the agency, opening it to public scrutiny and involvement.

Legislation
In the Kentucky Senate, he has sponsored legislation requiring school districts to focus on equal educational opportunities. He is the founder of the Kentucky Education Reform African American and All Children's Caucus. He sponsored the law that created the KCHIP Program to provide health care coverage for more of Kentucky's uninsured children and expanded Medicaid coverage for children. He sponsored laws that required the identification of the special needs of the minority elderly population and created the African American Heritage Commission. He sponsored legislation amending the Kentucky Constitution to remove segregation by race, prohibit racial profiling by law enforcement, and prohibit the execution of a person when evidence shows racial bias in prosecution.

On May 27, 2010, the Senate adopted Senator Neal's resolution reaffirming the principles of equality preserved in the U. S. Constitution, the Civil Rights Act of 1964, and the Kentucky Civil Rights Act of 1966. The resolution states that the Senate "recognizes the need for equality of all persons in the United States, and in the Commonwealth of Kentucky, and the protection of that equality."

Health
Neal was hospitalized in Louisville with COVID-19 on September 7, 2020.

Honors and awards
Senator Neal has received many honors and commendations for his distinguished service to community, the legal profession, and as a Kentucky State Legislator. Among his honors for distinguished service are the Clarence Mitchell Award from the Kentucky State Conference of NAACP Branches for his support of Civil Rights legislation; the Anderson Laureate Award for his impact on his community, state, and nation; the 1998 Man of the Year from Sigma Pi Phi fraternity-Psi Boule chapter; the 2001 Distinguished Citizen Award from the Kappa Alpha Psi fraternity; the Georgia Davis Powers Humanitarian Award; the Public Advocate Award for passage of legislation to Abolish Racial Profiling; the Kentucky Public Advocates Award for passage of the Racial Justice Act; and the Nelson Mandela Lifetime Achievement Award from the Kentucky Department of Public Advocacy. He served as a United Nations observer and Monitor for the historic April 1994 all- race elections in South Africa. He is a 2001 inductee of the Kentucky Civil Rights Hall of Fame.

References

External links
Kentucky Legislature - Senator Gerald Neal  official KY Senate website
Project Vote Smart - Senator Gerald A. Neal (MT) profile
Follow the Money - Gerald A Neal
2006 2004 2002 2000 1996 campaign contributions

1945 births
20th-century African-American people
21st-century African-American politicians
21st-century American politicians
African-American state legislators in Kentucky
Democratic Party Kentucky state senators
Living people
Politicians from Louisville, Kentucky